Khazim is a name of Arabic origin.

List of people with the given name 
 Khazim ibn Khuzayma al-Tamimi

List of people with the surname 
 Abd Allah ibn Khazim al-Sulami
 Abdallah ibn Khazim al-Tamimi
 Khuzayma ibn Khazim
 Shu'ayb ibn Khazim
 Zouhair Khazim

See also 
 Kazeem (disambiguation)

Surnames
Masculine given names
Arabic masculine given names
Surnames of Arabic origin